The Los Angeles Avengers were an Arena Football League team based in Los Angeles, California, from 2000 through 2008. They folded on April 19, 2009.

History
The Los Angeles Avengers played their home games at the Staples Center, which is also the current home to the Los Angeles Kings of the National Hockey League, the Los Angeles Lakers and Los Angeles Clippers of the National Basketball Association, the Los Angeles Sparks of the Women's National Basketball Association. The team began play in the 2000 season. The Avengers competed in the Western Division of the American Conference. Since its inception in 2000, the Avengers had competed in postseason play five times. The Avengers earned American Conference wildcard playoff berths in 2002, 2003, 2004, and 2007, and won the American Conference Western Division Championship in 2005.

The Avengers franchise was owned by Casey Wasserman, grandson of the MCA head Lew Wasserman.

On April 10, 2005, Avengers defensive lineman Al Lucas was injured attempting to make a tackle and later died at a nearby hospital. It is the only fatal injury incurred during a game in the history of the league. The Al Lucas Hero Award is named after him.

The Avengers announced the termination of the program on April 20, 2009 after nine years of operation.  Four years later, it was announced that the Los Angeles KISS would join the AFL starting in the 2014 season making them the fourth team to set up shop in the Los Angeles area.

The Avengers' official mascot was a superhero-like character named T.D.

Memorable Avengers' highlights
 On Sunday, March 30, 2003, in a Week 9 road game against the Orlando Predators, the Avengers trailed 63–58 late in the game. However, Los Angeles managed to recover an onside kick and, on the last play of the game, quarterback Tony Graziani threw a 32-yard touchdown pass that bounced off the rebound net and was caught by WR/LB Greg Hopkins, giving the Avengers a 64–63 win.
 On Sunday, March 31, 2004, In the championship series taking place at Staples Center, Los Angeles, Ca. #98 John Garcia not only led the team in sacks on this day with 3 also blocked and returned a FG to win the game against the Chicago Rush. Final Score 24–26. Quarterback Tony Graziani threw for only 1 Touchdown pass and 3 INT's.
 On April 10, 2005, in a game against the New York Dragons, Al Lucas tackled Corey Johnson during a kickoff return with 10:17 to go in the first quarter. Replays showed that Johnson's knee hit Lucas' helmet, and Lucas did not move again after falling to the ground.[4] Later replays and reports showed nothing abnormal on the play.[5] Dr. William Lang, the team physician, attempted to revive him on the field. He appeared to suffer a spinal cord injury. After being treated for approximately a half an hour at the Staples Center, Lucas was rushed to nearby California Hospital Medical Center, where he was pronounced dead at 1:28pm PDT. It is unknown whether Lucas died on the field, or after treatment failed. An autopsy revealed that he died of blunt force trauma and an upper spinal cord injury.[3]

Season-by-season

Coaches

Notable players

Final roster

Arena Football Hall of Famers

Individual awards

Retired uniform numbers

All-Arena players
The following Avengers players were named to All-Arena Teams:
 QB Tony Graziani (1)
 FB/LB Elcardos Worthen (1)
 WR/DB Kevin Ingram (3)
 WR/LB Greg Hopkins (2)
 OL/DL Victor Hall (1), Silas DeMary (1)
 DL Silas DeMary (1)
 OS Chris Jackson (1)
 DS Mark Ricks (1)
 K Remy Hamilton (3)
MLB John Cook Jr (2)

All-Ironman players
The following Avengers players were named to All-Ironman Teams:
 FB/LB Josh Jeffries (1)
 WR/DB Kevin Ingram (3)
 DB/RB Dave Dawson (1)
 WR/LB Chris Jackson (1), Greg Hopkins (2)
 OL/DL Victor Hall (1), Tony Plantin (1)

All-Rookie players
The following Avengers players were named to All-Rookie Teams:
 QB Todd Marinovich, Sonny Cumbie
 WR/LB Chris Jackson
 OL/DL Arnold Miller
 DS Damen Wheeler
 K Brian Reaves

Staff

References

External links
 Los Angeles Avengers at ArenaFan

 
2000 establishments in California
2009 disestablishments in California
Defunct American football teams in California
Sports organizations established in 2000